Angelo Monticelli (1778 – 1837) was an Italian neoclassical painter.

He was a pupil of Andrea Appiani. He painted the second sipario or curtain for La Scala Theater in Milan (1821), as well as for the theater in Pesaro.

A painter Angiolo Monticelli (1678-1749) is stated as a Bolognese landscape painter, who studied under Marcantonio Franceschini. It is unclear if he is related to either this Angelo, or to Andrea Monticelli.

Gallery

Sources

1778 births
1837 deaths
18th-century Italian painters
Italian male painters
19th-century Italian painters
Italian neoclassical painters
Place of birth missing
19th-century Italian male artists
18th-century Italian male artists